The Women's 100m backstroke event at the 2010 South American Games was held on March 29, with the heats at 10:35 and the Final at 18:10.

Medalists

Records

Results

Heats

Final

References
Heats
Final

Back 100m W